Centromere protein H is a protein that in humans is encoded by the CENPH gene.

Function 

Centromere and kinetochore proteins play a critical role in centromere structure, kinetochore formation, and sister chromatid separation. The protein encoded by this gene colocalizes with inner kinetochore plate proteins CENP-A and CENP-C in both interphase and metaphase. CENP-H is required for the localisation of CENP-C, but not CENP-A, to the centromere. However, it may be involved in the incorporation of newly synthesised CENP-A into centromeres via its interaction with the CENP-A/CENP-HI complex. CENP-H localizes outside of centromeric heterochromatin, where CENP-B is localized, and inside the kinetochore corona, where CENP-E is localized during prometaphase. It is thought that this protein can bind to itself, as well as to CENP-A, CENP-B or CENP-C. Multimers of the protein localize constitutively to the inner kinetochore plate and play an important role in the organization and function of the active centromere-kinetochore complex. CENP-H contains a coiled-coil structure and a nuclear localisation signal.

Studies show that CENP-H may be associated with certain human cancers.

CENP-H shows sequence similarity to the Schizosaccharomyces pombe kinetochore protein Fta3 which is a subunit of the Sim4 complex. This complex is required for loading the DASH complex onto the kinetochore via interaction with dad1. Fta2, Fta3 and Fta4 associate with the central core and inner repeat region of the centromere.

Other Protein Interactions
CENPH has also been shown to interact with KIAA0090.  The significance of this interaction is unclear.

References

External links

Further reading

Protein domains